Athabasca Regional Airport  is a registered aerodrome located  east northeast of Athabasca, Alberta, Canada. It serves private and commercial aircraft.

Runway 

Services 
An air courier service flies into Athabasca Regional twice on weekdays. The airport itself is accessible to pilots and aircraft 24 hours a day, 7 days a week.

In June 2015, a pilot's lounge was opened. It features access to men's and women's washrooms and Wi-Fi.

References

External links
Page about this airport on COPA's Places to Fly airport directory
 http://www.athabascacounty.com/airport/

Registered aerodromes in Alberta
Athabasca County
Athabasca, Alberta